BD-14 may refer to:
Bede BD-14, an American homebuilt aircraft design
Dinajpur District, Bangladesh, a district in Northern Rangpur, Bangladesh
The Bangladeshi variant of the Type 67 machine gun